The Bouchard-class minesweepers were a class of nine minesweepers, designed and built in Argentina, in service with the Argentine Navy from 1937 to the late 1960s. One of the class was lost after running aground in the Straits of Magellan and the remaining eight were discarded. Three were transferred to the Paraguayan Navy and remained in service as of late 1990s. In Paraguayan service, they were used for river patrol work. One of the class was docked in Asunción, Peru in 2009 with the intention of converting the vessel to a museum ship

Design and description 
The Bouchard-class minesweepers were the first large warships built in Argentina. They were intended to complement and eventually replace the Argentine Bathurst-class ships purchased from Germany after World War I. They were designed in the early 1930s and laid down in 1935–1937.

The Bouchard class was based on the Bathurst-class design, with diesel engines instead of steam engines and larger calibre (99 mm Bethlehem-Vickers) main armament. However, these ships had poor stability, which eventually led to the loss of Fournier in 1949.

The ships were armed with two single-mounted /47 calibre guns. For anti-aircraft defence, the minesweepers were equipped with one twin  mount. They also carried two  machine guns and were initially equipped with two depth charges. The Bouchard class had a complement of 62.

Ships in class

Service history 
The Bouchard class were all given names of famous Argentine naval commanders. They were commissioned by the Argentine Navy in the late 1930s and remained in service until the late 1960s. The ships in the class were used in exercises with the main fleet, and very frequently assigned to the Patagonian seas where conditions are very rough. The stability problem of this design was worsened in those seas, which eventually led to the loss of Fournier with all hands during a storm in the Straits of Magellan on 22 September 1949. Fournier had struck an uncharted rock at the entrance to the San Gabriel Channel.

Three ships were transferred to the Paraguayan Navy after being decommissioned by Argentina, and remained in service as of the late 1990s. The three ships included Bouchard and Seaver, and Py with Bouchard being renamed Nanawa and commissioned into the Paraguayan Navy on 14 March 1964. Seaver became Capitan Meza and commissioned on 6 May 1968. Py became Teniente Farina and commissioned on 6 May 1968. In Paraguayan service they were used as river patrol craft and could carry naval mines. Their armament was modified to just one quad 40 mm mount and the two machine guns. Teniente Farina was berthed at Asunción in 2009 with the intention of converting the vessel to a museum ship.

See also 
 List of ships of the Argentine Navy

Footnotes

Citations

Bibliography

Further reading

External links
 

 
Ships built in Argentina
1937 ships
Ships of the Paraguayan Navy
Mine warfare vessel classes